Coniston Hall is a former house on the west bank of Coniston Water in the English Lake District.  It is recorded in the National Heritage List for England as a designated Grade II* listed building.

The house dates from the late 16th century, or possibly earlier.  It is built in stone rubble with a slate roof.  Part of it is now ruined, part is used as a farmhouse, and another part is used by a sailing club.

The hall is owned by the National Trust, but is not open to the public.

See also

Grade II* listed buildings in South Lakeland
Listed buildings in Coniston, Cumbria

References

External links
Coniston and Tarn Hows - National Trust site, includes information on Monk Coniston Hall garden and grounds

Grade II* listed houses in Cumbria
Country houses in Cumbria
Gardens in Cumbria
National Trust properties in the Lake District
Hall